Maybe Better is an Australian Thoroughbred racehorse who won the 2006 Group 3 Saab Quality and finished 3rd in the 2006 Melbourne Cup when ridden by Chris Munce. Maybe Better started in 29 races placing for six wins, three 2nds and two 3rds, with earnings of A$959,600.

References
Notes

Sources
 Maybe Better's racing record

Racehorses bred in Australia